Val-d'Épy is a commune in the Jura department in the Bourgogne-Franche-Comté region in eastern France. On 1 January 2016, the former communes of Florentia, Nantey and Senaud were merged into Val-d'Épy. On 1 January 2018, the former commune of La Balme-d'Épy was merged into Val-d'Épy.

Population

See also 
 Communes of the Jura department

References 

Communes of Jura (department)